The Shengping Theater is a theater in Jiufen, Ruifang District, New Taipei, Taiwan.

History
In 1916, the land where the theater stands today was donated by Yan Yun-nian. The Taihoku Prefecture government then raised fund to construct a theater. A simple theater was then constructed in the area which could accommodate 400 people. In 1927, the building collapsed and was rebuilt in 1934 as the Shengping Stage. After the handover of Taiwan from Japan to the Republic of China in 1945, the theater was renamed Shengping Theater. The building was reconstructed in 1961. The building was almost destroyed by the 1986 Pacific typhoon season and was subsequently closed in the same year. In 1994, the theater roof was damaged by typhoon. In 2009, the building was donated to Taipei County Government. The county government then designated the building as a historical monument on 28 June 2010. In October 2010, renovation work was carried out and completed in 2011. The theater was then reopened to the public.

Architecture
The theater covers an area of 660 m2. The wall was constructed using hollow bricks and its roofs is decorated with Chinese cypress. The building consists of two floors. The ground floor consists of six-seat style seating and the upper floor consists of U-shaped grandstand's wooden-chairs.

Activities
The theater regularly showcases movies, Taiwanese operas etc.

See also
 Cinema of Taiwan

References

1916 establishments in Taiwan
Buildings and structures in New Taipei
Theatres completed in 1934
Theatres in Taiwan